The men's team pursuit race of the 2014–15 ISU Speed Skating World Cup 4, arranged in the Thialf arena in Heerenveen, Netherlands, was held on 12 December 2014.

The South Korean team won the race, while the Dutch team came second, and the Norwegian team came third.

Results
The race took place on Friday, 12 December, in the afternoon session, scheduled at 18:12.

References

Men team pursuit
4